Ralph Lerner may refer to:

Ralph Lerner (philosopher), American political philosopher
Ralph Lerner (architect), American architect